Syed Shahabuddin (born 1 July 1979) is an Indian first class cricketer who played for Andhra Pradesh.

References

External links
 

1979 births
Living people
Indian cricketers
Andhra cricketers
People from Anantapur district
Cricketers from Andhra Pradesh
Hyderabad Heroes cricketers